Hendrik Koekoek (22 May 1912 – 8 February 1987) was a Dutch farmer, politician, and founder of the defunct Farmers' Party (Boerenpartij; BP).

Koekoek was the leader and party chair of the BP from 1958 until 1981. He served as the party's Parliamentary leader in the House of Representatives from 5 June 1963 until 10 June 1981. He was also a member of the States-Provincial of Gelderland between 6 June 1962 and 5 June 1963. Although he was widely known, he was never a major force in the Dutch political landscape.

References

External links

Official
  H. (Hendrik) Koekoek Parlement & Politiek

1912 births
1987 deaths
Christian Historical Union politicians
Dutch farmers
Dutch members of the Dutch Reformed Church
Dutch people of World War II
Dutch political activists
Dutch political party founders
\Farmers' Party (Netherlands) politicians
Leaders of political parties in the Netherlands
Members of the House of Representatives (Netherlands)
Members of the Provincial Council of Gelderland
Municipal councillors in Gelderland
Party chairs of the Netherlands
People from Ede, Netherlands
People from Hoogeveen
Royal Netherlands Army personnel of World War II
Royal Netherlands Army personnel
World War II civilian prisoners
20th-century Dutch politicians